Sturman is a surname. Notable people with the surname include:

 Reuben Sturman (1924–1997), American pornographer and businessman
 Walter Sturman (1882–1958), English cricketer

See also
 Sturmanite
 Josef Stürmann